Elmo Pearce Lee (February 10, 1882 – July 26, 1949) was a United States circuit judge of the United States Court of Appeals for the Fifth Circuit.

Education and career

Born in Coushatta, Louisiana, Lee received a Bachelor of Laws from the Paul M. Hebert Law Center at Louisiana State University in 1911. He was in private practice in Mansfield, Louisiana from 1911 to 1928, and in Shreveport, Louisiana from 1928 to 1943.

Federal judicial service

Lee was nominated by President Franklin D. Roosevelt on November 5, 1943, to a seat on the United States Court of Appeals for the Fifth Circuit vacated by Judge Rufus Edward Foster. He was confirmed by the United States Senate on November 30, 1943, and received his commission on December 17, 1943. Lee died in office on July 26, 1949.

References

Sources
 

1882 births
1949 deaths
Judges of the United States Court of Appeals for the Fifth Circuit
Louisiana lawyers
Louisiana State University Law Center alumni
People from Coushatta, Louisiana
United States court of appeals judges appointed by Franklin D. Roosevelt
20th-century American judges